Laurent-Emmanuel de Renaud d'Aleins  (Alleins, 12 July 1739 — ) was a French Navy officer. He served in the War of American Independence.

Biography 
Aleins was born to a noble family of Salon de Provence. He joined the Navy as a Garde-Marine in 1750. He was promoted to Lieutenant in 1764 and to Captain in 1777. 

Aleins captained the 74-gun Hector at the Battle of Fort Royal on 29 April 1781 and at the Battle of the Chesapeake on 5 September 1781. He took part in the Battle of the Saintes on 12 April 1782 as captain of the 74-gun Neptune.

He served as Albert de Rions' flag captain during the naval review held for Louis XVI in Cherbourg in 1786. That same year, he was promoted to Chef de Division.

Sources and references 
 Notes

Citations

References
 
 
 

French Navy officers
French military personnel of the American Revolutionary War